Ypres was a 1925 feature-length documentary produced by British Instructional Films,  directed by Walter Summers. It was made up entirely of reconstructions of the various Battles of Ypres performed by members of the British Armed Forces. The following year, Summers directed another battle reconstruction: Mons.

The film was remastered with a new soundtrack for its DVD release in 2010.
The documentary can be viewed in its entirety on the British Pathé website.

References

Bibliography
 Alan Burton & Steve Chibnall. Historical Dictionary of British Cinema. Scarecrow Press, 2013.

External links
 Ypres, full documentary

1925 films
1925 documentary films
1925 war films
British documentary films
British silent feature films
British war films
Ypres
Films directed by Walter Summers
British black-and-white films
Documentary films about World War I
1920s English-language films
1920s British films
Silent war films